Like many other U.S. states, the politics of Oregon largely concerns regional issues. Oregon leans Democratic as a state, with both U.S. senators from the Democratic party, as well as four out of Oregon's six U.S. Representatives. The Democratic candidate for president has won in Oregon in every election since 1988. Both houses of Oregon's legislative assembly have been under Democratic control since the 2012 elections.

For most of its existence, Oregon was the most consistently Republican west coast state. Between 1860 and 1984, the state voted Democratic just six times, in 1868, 1912, 1932, 1936, 1940, and 1964. 

In 1954, the upset of incumbent Republican Senator Guy Cordon by Democrat Richard L. Neuberger, along with Democratic wins in the U.S. House and statewide races and pickups of fourteen and two seats in the state House and Senate, respectively, signaled the beginning of a shift towards the Democratic Party.  The last Republican governor of Oregon was Victor G. Atiyeh, who served from 1979 to 1987. Since 1988, Oregon voters have consistently favored Democratic candidates for most major elected positions, including the U.S. presidency.

History

The longest-serving governor in Oregon history is John Kitzhaber, who served two consecutive terms as governor, then left office before returning to win a third term in 2010 ahead of Republican and former Portland Trail Blazer Chris Dudley and the 2014 election against Republican Dennis Richardson.  Kitzhaber resigned in February 2015 after allegations of financial impropriety involving his partner and girlfriend, Cylvia Hayes, and certain lobbying efforts.

The state is broken up into two main geographically separate political areas: the generally liberal cities of the Willamette Valley and the rest of the state, whose voters are typically conservative or right wing. While about 47% of the population of Oregon lives in the Portland metropolitan area as of 2013, the rest of the state has a rural population with generally conservative views on state taxes. Because of the greater population living in the liberal Willamette Valley cities compared to the rest of Oregon, the state has very liberal laws, including on public health care, recreational and medical marijuana, assisted dying, and environmental protections.

In the 2016 presidential election, Democrat Hillary Clinton received 50.07% of the vote, while Republican candidate Donald Trump received 39.09%.  Trump performed best in Lake County, winning 77% of the 5,400 registered voters. Hillary Clinton performed best in Multnomah County, where she received 73% of the vote. Libertarian candidate Gary Johnson performed best in Gilliam County, where he received 8% of the vote. Columbia and Tillamook counties in the far northwest of Oregon are among 181 pivot counties out of more than 3,000 counties nationwide that Barack Obama carried in 2008 and 2012, but flipped to Donald Trump in 2016 and 2020.

Political geography
Oregon's politics are largely divided by the Cascade Mountains, with much of western Oregon leaning Democratic and eastern Oregon leaning Republican. The rapidly-growing area around Bend in Central Oregon has created Democratic voter registration majorities in Deschutes County. Republicans have some strongholds in the western part of the state outside of larger cities.  Linn County, between the liberal cities of Eugene and Salem, has voted for the Republican presidential candidate in every election since 1980. Southern Oregon is also a Republican stronghold, except in Jackson County, which frequently votes for both Republican and Democratic candidates.

In the 1998 gubernatorial election, the only county won by Republican candidate Bill Sizemore was Malheur County. Because of the concentration of population in Portland and the Willamette Valley, Gov. Kate Brown, a Democrat, won the 2018 election despite carrying only 7 of Oregon's 36 counties.

Based on voting data from the 2012 presidential election, Ontario in Malheur County was rated as the most Republican in the state. Gresham in Multnomah County was rated as the most Democratic.

The last time a Democrat won every county in the state in a presidential election was in 1936, when Franklin D. Roosevelt carried all counties. The last time a Republican accomplished this feat was in 1928, when every county was won by Herbert Hoover. The last time a third-party candidate won any county was in 1912, when Theodore Roosevelt carried Clatsop, Columbia, Jackson, and Washington counties on the Progressive ticket. Independent candidate Ross Perot won 24.7% of the 1992 presidential vote in Oregon, but carried no counties.

Key issues
Key issues in Oregon include:

Employment
Environmental protection
Native American relations (particularly in respect to gambling and casinos)
Public health care
Public transportation
School funding
Taxes
Land use

Ideology
Similar to the West Coast states of California and Washington, Oregon has a high percentage of people who identify as liberals. A 2013 Gallup poll that surveyed the political ideology of residents in every state found that people in Oregon identified as:

 34.8% moderate
 33.6% conservative 
 27.9% liberal

A 2008 analysis by political statistician Nate Silver on states' political ideology noted that the state's conservatives were the most conservative of any state (more so than Utah or Tennessee) and that the state's liberals were more liberal than any state (more so than Vermont or D.C.).

Political parties 

According to the state's election agency, as of October 2022, there were 2,976,195 registered voters in Oregon.

Oregon's Federal Representation

Oregon currently has 6 House districts In the 118th Congress, 4 of Oregon's seats are held by Democrats and 2 are held by Republicans. There are as follows:

Oregon's 1st congressional district represented by Suzanne Bonamici (D)
Oregon's 2nd congressional district represented by Cliff Bentz (R)
Oregon's 3rd congressional district represented by Earl Blumenauer (D)
Oregon's 4th congressional district represented by Val Hoyle (D)
Oregon's 5th congressional district represented by Lori Chavez-DeRemer (R)
Oregon's 6th congressional district represented by Andrea Salinas (D)

Oregon's two United States Senators are Democrats Ron Wyden and Jeff Merkley, serving since 1996 and 2009, respectively. 

Oregon is part of the United States District Court for the District of Oregon in the federal judiciary. The district's cases are appealed to the San Francisco-based United States Court of Appeals for the Ninth Circuit.

See also 
 Political party strength in Oregon

References

External links